Golce  is a village in the administrative district of Gmina Wałcz, within Wałcz County, West Pomeranian Voivodeship, in north-western Poland. Golce are inhabited by approximately 300 people.

References

Golce